Jeff Davis, a steam gunboat, was employed by the Confederates on the Ohio and Mississippi Rivers during the early years of the war. She was captured at Memphis by gunboats of the Mississippi Squadron in early June 1862, and later taken into Union service.

Notes 

Ships of the Confederate States Navy
Ships captured by the United States Navy from the Confederate States Navy